"Everytime We Touch" is a song performed by French DJ David Guetta, American singer Chris Willis and Swedish DJs Steve Angello and Sebastian Ingrosso from Guetta's third studio album, Pop Life (2007). The song was released as the album's sixth and final single on 16 January 2009.

Guetta's proclaimed favourite song from the album was written with long-term collaborator Willis, and co-produced with Swedish House Mafia members Angello and Ingrosso. The track was serviced to Australian radio on 23 February 2009.

Track listing
 German CD single
 "Everytime We Touch" (David Tort Remix) – 8:34
 "Everytime We Touch" (Inpetto Remix) – 7:51
 "Everytime We Touch" (Robbie Rivera Remix) – 9:04
 "Everytime We Touch" (extended mix) – 7:58
 "Everytime We Touch" (radio edit) – 3:15

Charts

References

2007 songs
2009 singles
Chris Willis songs
David Guetta songs
Sebastian Ingrosso songs
Song recordings produced by David Guetta
Songs written by Chris Willis
Songs written by David Guetta
Songs written by Sebastian Ingrosso
Songs written by Steve Angello
Steve Angello songs
Virgin Records singles
Song recordings produced by Sebastian Ingrosso
Song recordings produced by Steve Angello